Coal Glen is an unincorporated community in Jefferson County, in the U.S. state of Pennsylvania.

History
Coal Glen was originally a mining community. A post office was established at Coal Glen in 1886, and remained in operation until 1931.

References

Unincorporated communities in Jefferson County, Pennsylvania
Unincorporated communities in Pennsylvania